Patton Bluff is a bluff situated between Shibuya Peak and Coleman Nunatak on the east side of Berry Glacier, in Marie Byrd Land. Mapped by United States Geological Survey (USGS) from surveys and U.S. Navy air photos, 1959–65. Named by Advisory Committee on Antarctic Names (US-ACAN) for Delbert E. Patton, United States Antarctic Research Program (USARP) ionospheric physicist at Byrd Station, 1962.

References 

Cliffs of Marie Byrd Land